Louder Than a Bomb is a 2010 American documentary film about Louder Than a Bomb, an annual youth poetry slam in Chicago. The film was directed and produced by Greg Jacobs and Jon Siskel. It follows the stories of several high school teams and individuals leading up to Louder Than a Bomb 2008 and their experiences at the slam. It opened theatrically in New York City on July 30, 2010 and opened in Los Angeles on August 6, 2010 at the 14th Annual DocuWeeks.

References

External links
 
 
 

2010 films
Documentary films about poets
American documentary films
2010 documentary films
Documentary films about Chicago
Works about slam poetry
2010s English-language films
2010s American films